Statistics of Swedish football Division 2 for the 1988 season.

League standings

Norra

Mellersta

Västra

Södra

References
 Sweden - List of final tables (Clas Glenning)

Swedish Football Division 2 seasons
3
Sweden
Sweden